The Battle of Basiani was fought, in the 13th century, between the armies of the Kingdom of Georgia and the Seljuqid Sultanate of Rum in the Basiani valley, 60 km northeast of the city of Erzurum in what is now northeast Republic of Turkey. The battle is variously dated between 1202 and 1205, but 1203 or 1204 has lately been given preference. The contemporary Muslim chronicler Ibn Bibi places the battle in 598 AH (October 1, 1201 – September 19, 1202). The modern Turkish historians identify the castle of Micingerd (Mazankert) as the location of the battle.

Background 
The battle was one of those several conflicts between the Georgian monarchs and the Seljuqid rulers of Anatolia that fill the region’s history of the 11th–13th century. It marked yet another attempt by the Seljuqids to stem the Georgian advances southward. The story of this conflict is narrated in the contemporary Georgian, Armenian and Islamic sources.

The sultan of Rüm, Rukn ad-Din Süleymanshah II ( 1196–1204), fought hard, with considerable success, to reassemble a once vast state fragmentized under his late father Kilij Arslan II. Initially, his relations with the neighboring kingdom of Georgia were ostensibly peaceful, including the exchange of embassies and precious gifts. However, Süleymanshah’s 1201 takeover of Erzurum whose last Saltukid ruler (malik) Ala ad-Din Muhammed was, at that time, a tributary to the Georgian crown, brought Süleymanshah II into an inevitable confrontation with the Georgians. The sultan further resented a tribute levied by the Georgian rulers upon the neighboring Muslim beyliks and requested its withdrawal in an ultimatum presented to the Georgian Queen regnant Tamar. According to the Georgian chronicle, Süleymanshah’s emissary delivered a highly offending letter to Tamar in which the sultan threatened to take her as a concubine upon his conquest of Georgia, and got slapped by Zakaria Mkhargrdzeli. According to medieval scholar who was watching this negotiations, Süleymanshah’s emissary was knocked out and "lying down like dead".

The battle 

Süleymanshah, joined by his vassal beys, crossed into the Georgian marchlands and encamped in the Basiani valley. Tamar quickly marshaled an army throughout her possessions and put it under command of her consort, David Soslan. From their base in Javakheti, the Georgian troops under Soslan and amirspasalar Zakaria Mkhargrdzeli made a sudden advance into Basiani and assailed the enemy’s camp. In a pitched battle, the Seljuqid forces managed to roll back several attacks of the Georgians but were eventually overwhelmed and defeated. Loss of the sultan's banner to the Georgians resulted in a panic within the Seljuq ranks. Süleymanshah himself was wounded and withdrew to Erzurum.

Aftermath  
The Georgians captured Rukn ad-Din Süleymanshah II's brother, who was later exchanged for one horseshoe. This action demonstrated that Tamar held absolute power in the Caucasus, Anatolia, Armenian Highlands, Shirvan and western parts of the Black Sea. The victory at Basiani allowed Georgia to secure its positions on the southwest and keep the Seljuqid resurgence in check. Soon after the battle, the Kingdom of Georgia invaded Trebizond to create a state. Tamar gave power to Alexios I of Trebizond, who was her sister's husband. Therefore the Kingdom of Georgia effectively created a buffer zone between Turkish states and feudal Georgian lands.

References

Sources 
 D. Ivane Javakhishvili, (1983), ქართველი ერის ისტორია (History of Georgian Nation),  Tbilisi: Georgia, USSR.
 Melikishvili, Giorgi et al. (1970), საქართველოს ისტორიის ნარკვევები (Studies in the History of Georgia), Vol. 2. Tbilisi: Sabch’ota Sakartvelo.
 Osman Turan, Selçuklular Zamaninda Türkiye, Istanbul, 1971
 V. Dondua et al. (transl., 1985), Жизнь царицы цариц Тамар (The Life of the Queen of Queens Tamar), Commentaries by N. Berdzenishvili. Tbilisi: Metsniereba

Battles involving the Sultanate of Rum
Battles involving the Kingdom of Georgia
Conflicts in 1202
13th century in the Kingdom of Georgia
1202 in Asia